Thomas Wight was a publisher and draper.

Thomas Wight may also refer to:

Thomas Wight (architect), partner in Wight and Wight
Thomas Wight (Bandon) (1640–1724), Quaker
Thomas Wight (priest), Irish priest in the 1600s

See also
Thomas White (disambiguation)
Thomas Whyte (disambiguation)